Ethmia angarensis is a moth in the family Depressariidae. It is found in China (Shanxi) and the Russian Far East.

Adults have been recorded from late June to July.

References

Moths described in 1939
angarensis